Bratley is an English surname. Notable persons with this name include:
George Bratley (1909–1978), English footballer
Len Bratley (1926–2011), English radio host
Len Bratley (rugby league) (1914–1974), English professional rugby league footballer 
Philip Bratley (1880–1962), English footballer
Tony Bratley (born 1939), English footballer